Ulli Beier Museum is an art gallery and art school in Osogbo, Nigeria. It was established by the artists Ulli Beier and Susanne Wenger.
Today it is an important contemporary African art gallery, hosting the work of talented and aspiring artists from the Osogbo area and across Nigeria.

References

Museums in Nigeria
African art museums
Osogbo
Art museums and galleries in Nigeria